The 1955 Green Bay Packers season was their 37th season overall and their 35th season in the National Football League. The team finished with a 6–6 record under coach Lisle Blackbourn, earning them a third-place finish in the Western Conference.

Offseason

NFL draft

Regular season

Schedule

Note: Intra-conference opponents are in bold text.

Standings

Roster

Awards, records, and honors

Tobin Rote, NFL Leader, Touchdown Passes, (17)

Milestones

References

Sportsencyclopedia.com

Green Bay Packers seasons
Green Bay Packers
Green Bay Packers